The 1947 Western Michigan Broncos football team represented Michigan College of Education (later renamed Western Michigan University) as a member of the Mid-American Conference during the 1947 college football season.  In its sixth season under head coach John Gill, the team compiled a 6–3 record (0–1 against MAC opponents) and was outscored by a total of 147 to 139.  The team played its home games at Waldo Stadium in Kalamazoo, Michigan.

Halfback Al Bush was the team captain. Guard Emerson Grossman received the team's most outstanding player award.

Western Michigan and Miami University were admitted to the MAC in July 1947. Wayne University then resigned from the conference in protest over the admission of schools not located in urban centers.

Schedule

References

Western Michigan
Western Michigan Broncos football seasons
Western Michigan Broncos football